This is a compilation of the results of the teams representing Denmark at official international women's football competitions, that is the UEFA Women's Cup and its successor, the UEFA Women's Champions League.

As of the 2016–17 edition Denmark is ranked 7th in the UWCL's association standings, and it is thus one of twelve associations currently granted two spots in the competition. Its major success to date is Fortuna Hjørring's appearance in the 2002–03 edition's final.

Teams
These are the three teams that have represented Denmark in the UEFA Women's Cup and the UEFA Women's Champions League.

Historical progression

Results by team

Brøndby

Fortuna Hjørring

Odense

References

Women's football clubs in international competitions
Women